Nikola Melnjak (born 6 September 1981) is a Croatian football defender, who pays for Austrian amateur side SV Rohrbrunn.

Career
He came to Spartak Trnava in the summer 2010. He later had an extensive spell in Austria, with several lower league sides.

References

1981 births
Living people
Sportspeople from Varaždin
Association football fullbacks
Croatian footballers
NK Varaždin players
NK Međimurje players
FC Spartak Trnava players
Croatian Football League players
Slovak Super Liga players
Austrian Landesliga players
Croatian expatriate footballers
Expatriate footballers in Slovakia
Croatian expatriate sportspeople in Slovakia
Expatriate footballers in Austria
Croatian expatriate sportspeople in Austria